This list of reptiles of Japan is primarily based on the IUCN Red List, which details the conservation status of some eighty-seven species. Of these, four are assessed as critically endangered (the hawksbill turtle and the endemic Toyama's ground gecko, Yamashina's ground gecko, and Kikuzato's brook snake), eleven as endangered, eleven as vulnerable, twelve as near threatened, forty-seven as of least concern, and two as data deficient.

According to statistics accompanying the 2020 Japanese Ministry of the Environment (MoE) Red List, one hundred species and subspecies are to be found, but the conservation status of only fifty-seven is detailed. Of these, five taxa are critically endangered from a national perspective, nine are endangered, twenty-three vulnerable, seventeen near threatened, and three data deficient.

Order: Squamata (lizards, snakes, and amphisbaenians)

Suborder: Lacertilia (lizards) 

Family: Agamidae
Genus: Diploderma
Ryukyu japalure, Diploderma polygonatum
Okinawa tree lizard, D. p. polygonatum(endemic subspecies) (MoE: VU)
Sakishima tree lizard, D. p. ishigakiense(endemic subspecies) (MoE: NT)
Yonaguni tree lizard, D. p. donan(endemic subspecies) (MoE: VU)
Taiwan japalure, Diploderma swinhonis (introduced)
Family: Dactyloidae
Genus: Anolis
Green anole, Anolis carolinensis (introduced)
Family: Eublepharidae
Genus: Goniurosaurus
Banded ground gecko, Goniurosaurus splendens (endemic) (MoE: EN)
Kuroiwa's ground gecko, Goniurosaurus kuroiwae (endemic)
Okinawa ground gecko, G. k. kuroiwae(endemic subspecies) (MoE: VU)
Sengoku ground gecko, G. k. sengokui(endemic subspecies) (MoE: EN)
Spotted ground gecko, Goniurosaurus orientalis (endemic) (MoE: CR)
Toyama's ground gecko, Goniurosaurus toyamai (endemic) (MoE: CR)
Yamashina's ground gecko, Goniurosaurus yamashinae (endemic) (MoE: CR)
Family: Gekkonidae
Genus: Gehyra
Stump-toed gecko, Gehyra mutilata
Genus: Gekko
Hokou gecko, Gekko hokouensis 
Schlegel's Japanese gecko, Gekko japonicus 
Tawa gecko, Gekko tawaensis (endemic) (MoE: NT)
Yakushima gecko, Gekko yakuensis (endemic) (MoE: VU)
Gekko shibatai (endemic) (MoE: NT)
Gekko vertebralis (endemic)
Genus: Hemidactylus
Asian house gecko, Hemidactylus frenatus 
Bowring's gecko, Hemidactylus bowringii (MoE: VU)
Genus: Hemiphyllodactylus
Indopacific tree gecko, Hemiphyllodactylus typus(introduced)
Genus: Lepidodactylus
Mourning gecko, Lepidodactylus lugubris
Genus: Perochirus
Micronesia saw-tailed gecko, Perochirus ateles (MoE: VU)
Family: Iguanidae
Genus: Iguana
Green iguana, Iguana iguana (introduced)
Family: Lacertidae
Genus: Takydromus
Amur grass lizard, Takydromus amurensis(MoE: NT)
Green grass lizard, Takydromus smaragdinus (endemic)
Japanese grass lizard, Takydromus tachydromoides (endemic)
Miyako grass lizard, Takydromus toyamai (endemic) (MoE: CR)
Sakishima grass lizard, Takydromus dorsalis (endemic) (MoE: VU)
Genus: Zootoca
Viviparous lizard, Zootoca vivipara  (MoE: VU)
Family: Scincidae
Genus: Ateuchosaurus
Ryukyu short-legged skink, Ateuchosaurus pellopleurus (endemic)
Genus: Cryptoblepharus
Ogasawara snake-eyed skink, Cryptoblepharus nigropunctatus (endemic) (MoE: NT)
Genus: Emoia
Mangrove skink, Emoia atrocostata
Beach skink, E. a. atrocostata(MoE: VU)
Genus: Plestiodon
Barbour's blue-tailed skink, Plestiodon barbouri (endemic) (MoE: VU)
Far-Eastern skink, Plestiodon latiscutatus  (endemic)
Kishinoue's giant skink, Plestiodon kishinouyei (endemic) (MoE: VU)
Okada's five-lined skink, Plestiodon latiscutatus  (endemic)
Okinawa blue-tailed skink, Plestiodon marginatus (endemic) (MoE: VU)
Ousima skink, Plestiodon oshimensis (endemic) (MoE: NT)
Senkaku skink, Plestiodon takarai (endemic) (MoE: EN)
Shanghai elegant skink, Plestiodon elegans 
Stimpson's skink, Plestiodon stimpsonii (endemic) (MoE: NT)
Plestiodon finitimus 
Plestiodon japonicus (endemic)
Plestiodon kuchinoshimensis (endemic) (MoE: DD)
Genus: Scincella
Boettger's ground skink, Scincella boettgeri (endemic)
Tsushima ground skink, Scincella vandenburghi

Suborder: Serpentes (snakes) 

Family: Calamariidae
Genus: Calamaria
Collared reed snake, Calamaria pavimentata 
Miyara's collared reed snake, C. p. miyarai(MoE: VU)
Pfeffer's reed snake, Calamaria pfefferi (endemic) (MoE: EN)
Family: Colubridae
Genus: Elaphe
Beauty ratsnake, Elaphe taeniura
Sakishima beauty ratsnake, E. t. schmackeri(endemic subspecies) (MoE: VU)
Taiwan beauty ratsnake, E. t. friesi(introduced)
Japanese four-lined ratsnake, Elaphe quadrivirgata 
Japanese ratsnake, Elaphe climacophora  (albino form at Iwakuni is a Natural Monument)
King ratsnake, Elaphe carinata
Chinese keeled ratsnake, E. c. carinata(MoE: EN)
Yonaguni keeled ratsnake, E. c. yonaguniensis(endemic subspecies) (MoE: EN)
Genus: Euprepiophis
Japanese woodsnake, Euprepiophis conspicillata 
Genus: Lycodon
, Lycodon semicarinatus (endemic)
Oriental odd-tooth snake, Lycodon orientalis (endemic)
Red-banded snake, Lycodon rufozonatus 
Red-banded odd-tooth snake, L. r. rufozonatus(MoE: NT)
Sakishima odd-tooth snake, L. r. walli(endemic subspecies)
Ruhstrat's wolf snake, Lycodon ruhstrati 
 (endemic) (MoE: NT)
Genus: Ptyas
, Ptyas semicarinatus (endemic)
Sakishima green snake, Ptyas herminae (endemic) (MoE: NT)
Genus: Rhabdophis
Tiger keelback, Rhabdophis tigrinus
Family: Elapidae
Genus: Emydocephalus
Ijima's sea snake, Emydocephalus ijimae  (MoE: VU)
Genus: Hydrophis
Annulated sea snake, Hydrophis cyanocinctus 
Black-headed sea snake, Hydrophis melanocephalus 
Ornate reef sea snake, Hydrophis ornatus 
Ryukyu ornate sea snake, H. o. maresinensis
Short sea snake, Hydrophis curtus 
Stokes's sea snake, Hydrophis stokesii 
Viperine sea snake, Hydrophis viperinus 
Yellow-bellied sea snake, Hydrophis platurus 
Genus: Laticauda
Blue-banded sea krait, Laticauda laticaudata   (MoE: VU)
Black-banded sea krait, Laticauda semifasciata   (MoE: VU)
Colubrine sea krait, Laticauda colubrina 
Genus: Sinomicrurus
, Sinomicrurus japonicus (endemic)
Amami coral snake, S. j. japonicus(endemic subspecies) (MoE: NT)
Okinawa coral snake, S. j. boettgeri(endemic subspecies) (MoE: NT)
MacClelland's coral snake, Sinomicrurus macclellandi
Iwasaki's coral snake, S. m. iwasakii(endemic subspecies) (MoE: VU)
Family: Natricidae
Genus: Hebius
Japanese keelback, Hebius vibakari
Danjo keelback, H. v. danjoense(endemic subspecies) (MoE: DD)
, Hebius pryeri (endemic)
Yaeyama keelback, Hebius ishigakiense (endemic)
, Hebius concelarum (endemic) (MoE: EN)
Genus: Opisthotropis
Kikuzato's brook snake, Opisthotropis kikuzatoi (endemic) (MoE: CR)
Family: Pareidae
Genus: Pareas
Iwasaki's snail-eater, Pareas iwasakii (endemic) (MoE: NT)
Family: Typhlopidae
Genus: Indotyphlops braminus
Brahminy blind snake, Indotyphlops braminus(introduced)
Family: Viperidae
Genus: Gloydius
Mamushi, Gloydius blomhoffii 
Tsushima Island pitviper, Gloydius tsushimaensis (endemic)
Genus: Ovophis
Ryukyu island pitviper, Ovophis okinavensis  (endemic)
Genus: Protobothrops
Sakishima habu, Protobothrops elegans (endemic)
Habu, Protobothrops flavoviridis (endemic)
Pointed-scaled pitviper, Protobothrops mucrosquamatus (introduced)
Tokara habu, Protobothrops tokarensis (endemic) (MoE: NT)
Family: Xenodermidae
Genus: Achalinus
Amami old-scaled snake, Achalinus werneri (endemic) (MoE: NT)
Formosan odd-scaled snake, Achalinus formosanus 
Yaeyama odd-scaled snake, A. f. chigirai(endemic subspecies) (MoE: VU)
Japanese odd-scaled snake, Achalinus spinalis

Order: Testudines (turtles)

Superfamily: Chelonioidea (sea turtles) 

Family: Cheloniidae
Genus: Caretta
Loggerhead sea turtle, Caretta caretta (MoE: EN)
Genus: Chelonia
Green sea turtle, Chelonia mydas (MoE: VU)
Genus: Eretmochelys 
Hawksbill sea turtle, Eretmochelys imbricata (MoE: EN)
Genus: Lepidochelys
Olive ridley sea turtle, Lepidochelys olivacea 
Family: Dermochelyidae
Genus: Dermochelys
Leatherback sea turtle, Dermochelys coriacea

Superfamily: Chelydroidea (snapping turtles) 
Family: Chelydridae
Genus: Chelydra
Snapping turtle, Chelydra serpentina  (introduced)

Superfamily: Testudinoidea (pond turtles and Geoemydid turtles) 

Family: Emydidae
Genus: Trachemys
Yellow-bellied slider turtle, Trachemys scripta (introduced)
Red-eared slider turtle, T. s. elegans(introduced)
Family: Geoemydidae
Genus: Cuora
Yellow-margined box turtle, Cuora flavomarginata 
, C. f. evelynae(endemic subspecies) (MoE: VU)
Genus: Geoemyda
Ryukyu black-breasted leaf turtle, Geoemyda japonica (endemic) (MoE: VU)
Genus: Mauremys
Japanese pond turtle, Mauremys japonica (endemic) (MoE: NT)
Reeves' pond turtle, Mauremys reevesii (introduced)
Yellow pond turtle, Mauremys mutica 
Ryukyu yellow pond turtle, M. m. kami(endemic subspecies) (MoE: VU)

Superfamily: Trionychia (softshell turtles) 
Family: Trionychidae
Genus: Pelodiscus
Chinese softshell turtle, Pelodiscus sinensis  (MoE: DD)

Japanese names

See also
 List of animals in Japan 
 Wildlife Protection Areas in Japan

References

External links
 Invasive Species of Japan: Reptiles

Reptiles
Japan
Japan